Otmar D. Wiestler (born 6 November 1956 in Freiburg im Breisgau) is a German physician, a professor at the University of Heidelberg and president of the Helmholtz Association. He is not a typical basic scientist, but he successfully entered a number of highly popular fields of clinical research, including cancer research, tumor genetics and, more recently, stem cell research. He focuses on technology transfer of already existing technologies from basic science into clinical use, rather than developing the basic science.

Career
From 1975 to 1981 Wiestler went to the Medical School at the Albert Ludwig University of Freiburg. Under the direction of Paul Kleihues and Benedict Volk, Wiestler worked as assistant at the University of Freiburg until 1994, when he finished his thesis with summa cum laude. As a PostDoc he joined Gernot Walter for three years at the Institute of Pathology at the University of California San Diego. From 1987 to 1992 he was staff physician at the Department of Neuropathology at the Institute of Pathology of the University Hospital in Zürich, Switzerland, again with Paul Kleihues. In 1989 he temporarily headed the department. From 1992 to 2003, he was elected full professor and chair for Neuropathology at the university clinics in Bonn.

Since 2000 Wiestler is known to the public as a supporter of stem cell research in Germany.

From 2002 to 2003 Wiestler was also CEO of LIFE & BRAIN GmbH in Bonn. In 2004, Wiestler succeeded Harald zur Hausen as Chairman and scientific member of the Foundation Board of the German Cancer Research Centre (DKFZ). In 2015 he became President of the Helmholtz Association. In 2019 he was re-elected for a second term until 2025.

Other activities

Corporate boards
 Bayer AG, Member of the Supervisory Board (since 2014)
 Siemens Medical Solutions, Member of the Advisory Board of Molecular Diagnostics (since 2007)

Non-profit organizations
 Berlin Institute of Health (BIH), Member of the Supervisory Board
 Technical University of Munich (TUM), Chairman of the Board of Trustees (since 2016)
 Helmholtz Association of German Research Centres, Vice-President (since 2007)
 Hertie Institute for Clinical Brain Research, Member of the Board of Trustees (since 2007)
 Georg Speyer House, Member of the Board (since 2006)
 Hertie Foundation, Member of the Board of Trustees (since 2005)
 German Cancer Aid, Chairman of the Advisory Committee and Member of the Board (since 2004)
 German Future Prize, Member of the Board of Trustees
 Max Planck Institute of Molecular Cell Biology and Genetics, Member of the Board of Trustees
 German Science Foundation (DFG), Chairman of the Technical Committee Theoretical Medicine (2000–2003)
 NCCR Neural Plasticity & Repair, Member of the Review Panel (since 2001)
 German Academy of Sciences Leopoldina, Member (since 2001)
 Stem Cell Network Research of North Rhine-Westphalia, Chairman (2002–2003)
 German Society for Neuropathology and Neuroanatomy, President (1998–1999)

Awards
On 8 April 2005  Wiestler received the Order of Merit of the Federal Republic of Germany.

Publications
Wiestler has numerous original publications in journals of the neuropathology and cancer research. He also edited several books and is in the Editorial Board of various journals.

Notes

External links 
 Director of German Cancer Research Center DKFZ

German oncologists
1956 births
Living people
Recipients of the Cross of the Order of Merit of the Federal Republic of Germany